The Conformist is a 1970 political drama film directed by Bernardo Bertolucci, whose screenplay is based on the 1951 novel The Conformist by Alberto Moravia. The film stars Jean-Louis Trintignant, Stefania Sandrelli, Gastone Moschin, Enzo Tarascio, Fosco Giachetti, José Quaglio, Dominique Sanda and Pierre Clémenti. The film was a co-production of Italian, French, and West German film companies.

Bertolucci made use of the 1930s art and decor associated with the Fascist era: the middle-class drawing rooms and the huge halls of the ruling elite.

Plot
In 1938 Paris, Marcello Clerici finalizes his preparations to assassinate his former college professor, Luca Quadri, leaving his wife Giulia in their hotel room. After receiving a telephone call, Marcello is picked up in a car driven by his subordinate, Special Agent Manganiello. The film often returns to the interior of this car, as the two of them pursue the professor and his wife.

A series of flashbacks depict Marcello discussing with his blind friend Italo his plans to marry, his somewhat awkward attempts to join the Fascist secret police, and his visits to his parents: a morphine-addicted mother at the family's decaying villa, and his unhinged father at an insane asylum.

In another flashback, Marcello is seen as a boy who is humiliated by his schoolmates until he is rescued by Lino, a chauffeur. Lino offers to show him a pistol and then makes sexual advances towards Marcello, which he partially responds to before grabbing the pistol and shooting wildly into the walls and into Lino, then flees from the scene of what he assumes is a murder.

In another flashback, Marcello and Giulia discuss the necessity of his going to confession, even though he is an atheist, in order for her Roman Catholic parents to allow them to marry. Marcello agrees and, in confession, admits to the priest to have committed many grave sins, including his homosexual intercourse with and subsequent murder of Lino, premarital sex, and his absence of guilt for these sins. Marcello admits he thinks little of his new wife but craves the normality that a traditional marriage with children will bring. The priest is shocked but quickly absolves Marcello once he hears that he is working for the Fascist secret police, called Organization for Vigilance and Repression of Anti-Fascism.

Marcello finds himself ordered to assassinate his old acquaintance and teacher, Professor Quadri, an outspoken anti-Fascist intellectual now living in exile in France. Using his honeymoon as a convenient cover, he takes Giulia to Paris where he can carry out the mission.

While visiting Quadri he falls in love with Anna, the professor's young wife, and pursues her. Although it becomes clear that she and her husband are aware of Marcello's Fascist sympathies and the danger he presents to them, she responds to his advances and forms a close attachment to Giulia, towards whom she also makes sexual advances. Giulia and Anna dress extravagantly and go to a dance hall with their husbands where Marcello's commitment to the fascists is tested by Quadri. Manganiello is also at the dance hall, having been following Marcello for some time and doubtful of his intentions. Marcello secretly returns the gun that he has been given and gives Manganiello the location of Quadri's country house where the couple plan to go the following day.

Even though Marcello has warned Anna not to go to the country with her husband and has apparently persuaded her to stay in Paris with him, she does make the car journey. On a deserted alpine road, Fascist agents attack and stab Quadri as Anna watches in horror. When the men turn their attention to her, she runs to the car behind for help. When Anna sees that the passenger in the rear of the car is Marcello and realizes his betrayal, she begins to scream uncontrollably, before running into the woods to escape the men trying to kill her. Marcello watches without emotion as she is pursued through the woods and finally shot to death. Manganiello walks away from the car for a cigarette, disgusted with what he sees as Marcello's cowardice in not shooting Anna when she ran to their car.

In 1943, Marcello now has a small child with Giulia and is apparently settled in a conventional life when the resignation of Benito Mussolini and the fascist dictatorship is announced. He is called by Italo for a meeting. While walking, they overhear a conversation between two men; Marcello recognizes one of them as Lino whom he thought he had murdered. Marcello publicly denounces Lino as a Fascist, homosexual and the murderer of the Quadris. In his frenzy, he also denounces Italo as a Fascist. As a monarchist political crowd sweeps past, taking Italo with them, Marcello sits near a small fire and stares intently behind him at the young man Lino had been talking to.

Cast

 Jean-Louis Trintignant as Marcello Clerici
 Pasquale Fortunato as 13-year-old Marcello
 Stefania Sandrelli as Giulia
 Gastone Moschin as Special Agent Manganiello
 Dominique Sanda as Anna Quadri, the Minister's Lover, and the Ventimiglia Prostitute
 Enzo Tarascio as Professor Luca Quadri
 Fosco Giachetti as The Colonel
 José Quaglio as Italo Montanari
 Pierre Clémenti as Pasqualino "Lino" Semirama
 Yvonne Sanson as Giulia's Mother
 Milly as Marcello's Mother
 Giuseppe Addobbati as Antonio Clerici (Marcello's Father)
 Antonio Maestri as Don Lattanzi (The Confessor)
 Christian Aligny as Raoul

Dubbing voices (Italian version)

 Sergio Graziani as Marcello Clerici
 Rita Savagnone as Anna Quadri
 Arturo Dominici as The Colonel
 Giuseppe Rinaldi as Italo Montanari
 Lydia Simoneschi as Giulia's Mother

Source: RaroVideo Blu-ray booklet.

Themes

The film is a case study in the psychology of conformism and fascism: Marcello Clerici is a bureaucrat, cultivated and intellectual but largely dehumanized by an intense need to be 'normal' and to belong to whatever is the current dominant socio-political group. He grew up in an upper class, perhaps dysfunctional family, and he suffered a major childhood sexual trauma and gun violence episode in which he long believed (erroneously) that he had committed a murder. He accepts an assignment from Benito Mussolini's secret police to assassinate his former mentor, living in exile in Paris. In Trintignant's characterization, Clerici is willing to sacrifice his values in the interests of building a supposedly "normal life."

According to the political philosopher Takis Fotopoulos, The Conformist (as well as Rhinoceros by Ionesco) is "a beautiful portrait of this psychological need to conform and be 'normal' at the social level, in general, and the political level, in particular."

According to the documentary Visions of Light the film is widely praised as a visual masterpiece. It was photographed by Vittorio Storaro, who used rich colors, authentic wardrobe of the 1930s, and a series of unusual camera angles and fluid camera movement. Film critic and author Robin Buss writes that the cinematography suggests Clerici's inability to conform with "normal" reality: the reality of the time is "abnormal." Also, Bertolucci's cinematic style synthesizes expressionism and "fascist" film aesthetics. Its style has been compared with classic German films of the 1920s and 1930s, such as in Leni Riefenstahl's Triumph of the Will and Fritz Lang's Metropolis.

In 2013, Interiors, an online journal concerned with the relationship between architecture and film, released an issue that discussed how space is used in a scene that takes place on the Palazzo dei Congressi. The issue highlights the use of architecture in the film, pointing out that in order to understand the film itself, it's essential to understand the history of the EUR district in Rome and its deep ties with fascism.

Production
The filming locations included Gare d'Orsay and Paris, France; Sant' Angelo Bridge and the Colosseum, both in Rome. Lead actor Trintignant learned his Italian-language lines phonetically, and per common practice in the Italian film industry at the time, was later dubbed over by another actor, Sergio Graziani.

The film was influential on other filmmakers: the image of blowing leaves in The Conformist, for example, influenced a very similar scene in The Godfather, Part II (1974) by Francis Ford Coppola. Additionally, the scene in which Dominique Sanda's character is chased through the snowy woods after her husband has been murdered, is echoed with mood, lighting and setting in a third-season episode of The Sopranos, "Pine Barrens", directed by Steve Buscemi.

Distribution
The film premiered at the 20th Berlin International Film Festival on 1 July 1970, where it competed for the Golden Bear. However, due to the row over the participation of Michael Verhoeven's anti-war film o.k., the festival was closed down three days later and no prizes were awarded.

The film had a staggered release in Italy, opening in major cities in the early months of 1971: Milan on 29 January, Turin on 5 February and Rome on 25 March, for example. In the United States, the film screened at the New York Film Festival on 18 September 1970 and was given a limited release in select cities the following spring, opening in New York and Los Angeles in April 1971, and Chicago and Washington D.C. in May 1971. The first American release of the film was trimmed by five minutes compared to the Italian release; the missing scene features a group of blind people having a dance. They were restored in the 1996 reissue.

The film was released in the United States on DVD by Paramount Home Entertainment on 5 December 2006. The DVD includes: the original theatrical version (runtime 111 minutes); The Rise of The Conformist: The Story, the Cast featurette; Shadow and Light: Filming The Conformist featurette; The Conformist: Breaking New Ground featurette.

In 2011 the Cineteca di Bologna commissioned a 2K restoration of The Conformist, supervised by Storaro himself (and approved by Bertolucci), which screened in the Cannes Classics series on May 11, 2011, in conjunction with the presentation of an honorary Palme d'Or to Bertolucci. The restoration was done by Minerva Pictures-Rarovideo USA and L'Immagine Ritrovata (laboratory of the Cineteca di Bologna). In 2014 the digital restoration was released theatrically by Kino Lorber in North America, and released on Blu-ray by Rarovideo USA on November 25, 2014.

Critical response
Vincent Canby, film critic for The New York Times, liked Bertolucci's screenplay and his directorial effort, and wrote "Bernardo Bertolucci...has at last made a very middle-class, almost conventional movie that turns out to be one of the elegant surprises of the current New York Film Festival...It is also apparent in Bertolucci's cinematic style, which is so rich, poetic, and baroque that it is simply incapable of meaning only what it says...The movie is perfectly cast, from Trintignant and on down, including Pierre Clementi, who appears briefly as the wicked young man who makes a play for the young Marcello. The Conformist is flawed, perhaps, but those very flaws may make it Bertolucci's first commercially popular film, at least in Europe where there always seems to be a market for intelligent, upper middle-class decadence."

A review in Variety stated "For those who appreciate its subtleties, but also its subsurface power and great evocative qualities, it's a gem." Gene Siskel of the Chicago Tribune gave the film two-and-a-half stars out of four and called it "much more of a show than a story," with its narrative themes "all but lost amid Bertolucci's splendid recreation of the era. In other words, if you are looking for fashion and furnishing hints, this is the place." Kevin Thomas of the Los Angeles Times wrote that the film "places young Bernardo Bertolucci in the front ranks of Italian directors and among the finest film-makers working anywhere. In this dazzling film, Bertolucci, 30, manages to combine the bravura style of a Fellini, the acute sense of period of a Visconti and the fervent political commitment of an Elio Petri ('Investigation of a Private Citizen') with complete individuality and, better still, a total lack of self-indulgence."

Gary Arnold of The Washington Post wrote that the film was "an extraordinarily beautiful and spellbinding picture," but "what's below the surface doesn't stand up to much analysis. I think this is true and that it amounts to a terrible flaw. The dramatic material, while intriguing, isn't adequately developed: many connecting or explanatory scenes appear to be missing (reading the original novel by Alberto Moravia restores some of these), the psychology of the most complex characters is murky, and the climactic and concluding scenes are positively trite." Jan Dawson of The Monthly Film Bulletin wrote, "In his screen adaptation of Moravia's novel, Bertolucci has eliminated all explanations or analysed motivations, as well as any allusions to Marcello's life before the moment he first sees Lino ... The effort of these changes, in purely psychological terms, is to reduce Marcello's story to a model Freudian case history."

In 1994, critic James Berardinelli wrote a review and heralded the film's look: "Storaro and Bertolucci have fashioned a visual masterpiece in The Conformist, with some of the best use of light and shadow ever in a motion picture. This isn't just photography, it's art — powerful, beautiful, and effective. There's a scene in the woods, with sunlight streaming between trees, that's breathtaking to behold — and all the more stunning because of the brutal events that take place before this background."

In a 2012 article in The Guardian, John Patterson defined the movie as an "expressionist masterpiece", which "offered a blueprint for a new kind of Hollywood film," inspiring New Hollywood film makers.

Awards
Wins
 Berlin Film Festival: Interfilm Award - Recommendation and Journalists' Special Award, Bernardo Bertolucci; 1970.
 David di Donatello Awards: David; Best Film, Maurizio Lodi-Fe; 1971.
 Belgian Film Critics Association: Grand Prix; 1972.
 National Society of Film Critics Awards: NSFC Award; Best Cinematography, Vittorio Storaro; Best Director, Bernardo Bertolucci; 1972.
 Satellite Awards: Satellite Award: Best Classic DVD; 2006.

Nominations
 Berlin Film Festival: Golden Berlin Bear, Bernardo Bertolucci; 1970.
 Academy Awards: Oscar; Best Writing, Screenplay Based on Material from Another Medium, Bernardo Bertolucci; 1972.
 Golden Globes: Golden Globe; Best Foreign-Language Foreign Film Italy; 1972.

Soundtrack
The CD soundtrack composed by Georges Delerue is available on Music Box Records label.

References

Further reading
 Tibbetts, John C., and James M. Welsh, eds. The Encyclopedia of Novels Into Film (2nd ed. 2005) pp 68–69.

External links

 
 
 
 
 The Conformist at RAI International
  (this scene is reviewed in documentary Visions of Light)
 Il conformista at DBCult Film Institute (Italian)

1970 films
1970s political drama films
1970 independent films
1970 LGBT-related films
Films scored by Georges Delerue
Films about fascists
Films about anti-fascism
Films about Fascist Italy
Films about sexual repression
Films about blind people
Films based on Italian novels
Films based on works by Alberto Moravia
Films directed by Bernardo Bertolucci
Films set in 1917
Films set in 1938
Films set in 1943
Films set in Paris
Films set in Rome
Films shot in Paris
Films shot in Rome
Italian independent films
Italian political drama films
French political drama films
German political drama films
1970s Italian-language films
Italian LGBT-related films
French LGBT-related films
German LGBT-related films
Gay-related films
French neo-noir films
Italian neo-noir films
Paramount Pictures films
West German films
German independent films
French independent films
1970 drama films
Nonlinear narrative films
1970s Italian films
1970s French films
1970s German films